Edikli is a belde (town) in the central district  (Niğde) of Niğde Province, Turkey. At   it is at the east of Misli plains. The population of the town is 5996 as of 2011. The settlement was known to be a Seljuk settlement. But it was ruined during the Mongol invasion in the 13th century. According to inscriptions on the oldest mosque of the town, the settlement was refounded in 1730s, during the Ottoman era. In 1970 it was declared a seat of township. Main agricultural product of the town is potato. Other crops like apple and nuts are also produced.

References 

Populated places in Niğde Province
Towns in Turkey
Niğde Central District